Hasilpur Tehsil is an administrative subdivision (tehsil) of Bahawalpur District in the Punjab province of Pakistan. The city of Hasilpur is the headquarters of the tehsil which is administratively subdivided into 15 Union Councils.

According to Population census 2017 there were 456,006 people living in Hasilpur Tehsil and its population in 1998 was 317,513.

Administration
The Union Councils of Tehsil Hasilpur are:

References

Tehsils of Bahawalpur District